David "Dave" Sampson (6 August 1944 – 26 July 2021) was an English professional rugby league footballer who played in the 1960s, 1970s and 1980s, and coached in the 1980s and 1990s.

Background
Dave Sampson's birth was registered in Leeds, West Riding of Yorkshire, England.

Playing career

BBC2 Floodlit Trophy Final appearances
Dave Sampson played left-, i.e. number 11, and scored a try in Bramley's 15–7 victory over Widnes in the 1973 BBC2 Floodlit Trophy Final during the 1973–74 season at Naughton Park, Widnes on Tuesday 18 December 1973.

Club career
Dave Sampson made his début for Wakefield Trinity during September 1963, he appears to have scored no drop-goals (or field-goals as they are currently known in Australasia), but prior to the 1974–75 season all goals, whether; conversions, penalties, or drop-goals, scored 2-points, consequently prior to this date drop-goals were often not explicitly documented, therefore '0' drop-goals may indicate drop-goals not recorded, rather than no drop-goals scored.

Coaching career

County Cup Final appearances
Dave Sampson was the coach in Castleford's 12–12 draw with Bradford Northern in the 1987 Yorkshire County Cup Final during the 1987–88 season at Headingley Rugby Stadium, Leeds on Saturday 17 October 1987, and the 2–11 defeat by Bradford Northern in the 1987 Yorkshire County Cup Final replay during the 1987–88 season at Elland Road, Leeds on Saturday 31 October 1987.

Club career
Dave Sampson was the coach of Castleford, his first game in charge was on 30 August 1987, and his last game in charge was on 24 April 1988.

Personal life
Dave Sampson was the father of the rugby league footballer Dean Sampson, younger brother of the rugby league footballer Malcolm Sampson, and uncle of the sprinter Denise Ramsden, and rugby union and rugby league footballer Paul Sampson.

His death was announced on 29 July 2021.

References

1944 births
2021 deaths
Bramley RLFC players
Castleford Tigers coaches
Castleford Tigers players
Doncaster R.L.F.C. coaches
English rugby league coaches
English rugby league players
Mansfield Marksman coaches
Rugby league centres
Rugby league players from Wakefield
Wakefield Trinity players